Oyrarbakki is a village on the west coast of the Faroese island of Eysturoy in the Sunda municipality, between Norðskáli and Oyri.

In 2005 the population was 97. Its postal code is FO 400.

The nearby 226-metre Streymin Bridge across to the island of Streymoy to the west opened in 1976. Oyrarbakki now has a large school, shops and a modern post office building.

See also

 List of towns in the Faroe Islands

References

External links
 Danish site with photographs of Oyrarbakki
 Sunda municipality website in Faroese only

Populated places in the Faroe Islands